Louis Cutter Wheeler (1910–1980) was an American botanist and professor of botany with an international reputation for his research on Euphorbiaceae.

Biography 
Louis Cutter Wheeler's father was a citrus farmer in California, where the summer appearance of the "intricate inflorescence" of Euphorbia albomarginata (rattlesnake weed) aroused Louis's interest in botany. After attending La Verne Junior College, he studied botany from 1931 to 1933 at UCLA under Carl Epling and from 1933 to 1934 at Claremont University College under Philip A. Munz. After graduating in 1934 with a master's degree, Wheeler worked for the U.S. Forest Service in the Siskiyou Mountains and in the Angeles National Forest within the San Gabriel Mountains. From 1936 to 1939 he was a graduate student at Harvard University. He was a co-collector with Bernice Giduz Schubert.

From 1939 to 1945 Wheeler was a botany instructor and research assistant at several different universities. At the University of Southern California, he became an assistant professor in 1945 and was eventually promoted to associate professor and then full professor, retiring as professor emeritus in 1975.

The Flora of Ceylon Project was supported by the Smithsonian Institution, the Ceylon Department of Agriculture, and the University of Ceylon, Peradeniya. Funded by the Project, Wheeler collected in the Puttalam District (1969), Anuradhapura District (1971), and Kandy District (1977).

Family
Louis Cutter Wheeler an older brother, Willis Hayes (1906–1996), and 4 sisters, Hazel Ruth (1908–2013), Florence Elizabeth (1914–1920), Muriel Flora (1917–2006), and Janet Lucile (1919–2016). Their father was born in Kansas and arrived in California around 1903 from Colorado. Their mother was born in Massachusetts and belonged to New England's Cutter family, whose history was written by William Richard Cutter. Louis Cutter Wheeler married Leota May Brice (1909–1995) in 1935. They had two daughters. Willis Hayes Wheeler became a plant pathologist and botanist, working for the USDA.

Selected publications

Articles
 1938. Lichens of Point Lobos Reserve. The Bryologist Vol. 41, No. 5 (Oct., 1938), pp. 107–113
 1941 Euphorbia subgenus Chamaesyce in Canada and the United States exclusive of southern Florida. Rhodora 43:97-154, 168-205, 223-286
 1941 Euphoribaceae of the Washington-Baltimore area . 10 pp.

Books
 1973. Cobb Estate Nature Trail. 33 pp. ed. Altadena CA: The Altadenan Publ. Co.

Eponyms
 (Euphorbiaceae) Chamaesyce geyeri var. wheeleriana (Warnock & M.C.Johnst.) Mayfield
 (Euphorbiaceae) Argythamnia wheeleri J.W.Ingram
 (Euphorbiaceae) Phyllanthus wheeleri G.L.Webster
 (Dothioraceae) Metasphaeria wheeleri Linder

References

1910 births
1980 deaths
University of California, Los Angeles alumni
Claremont Graduate University alumni
Harvard University alumni
University of Southern California alumni
Fellows of the American Association for the Advancement of Science
People from La Verne, California
20th-century American botanists